Neumichtis archephanes is a moth of the family Noctuidae. It is found in Australia, including Tasmania.

Cuculliinae
Moths described in 1920